Uwe Madeja (born 6 February 1959) is an East German sprint canoer who competed in the 1980s. He won a silver in the C-2 1000 m event at the 1980 Summer Olympics in Moscow.

Madeja also won three medals at the ICF Canoe Sprint World Championships with a silver (C-2 1000 m: 1981) and two bronzes (C-2 500 m: 1985, C-2 1000 m: 1982).

He is married to Silvia Rinka, who competed for East Germany in swimming at the 1980 Summer Olympics in the breaststroke.

References

1959 births
Canoeists at the 1980 Summer Olympics
German male canoeists
Living people
Olympic canoeists of East Germany
Olympic silver medalists for East Germany
Olympic medalists in canoeing
ICF Canoe Sprint World Championships medalists in Canadian
Medalists at the 1980 Summer Olympics